Jelcz (pronounced like Yelch after the town of the same name) is a Polish brand of trucks, military vehicles, buses and trolley buses produced by Zakłady Samochodowe Jelcz/Jelczańskie Zakłady Samochodowe, with both names roughly translating as Automotive Works of [town] Jelcz.

Currently, the company operates as Jelcz with a focus on manufacturing offroad military trucks.

History 
In 1952, a decision was made to use a former German armaments factory in Jelcz-Laskowice near Wrocław for production in western Poland. A company called Zakłady Budowy Nadwozi Samochodowych (Automobile Chassis Works) was established. After the reconstruction of the factory, the company started to develop and build car bodies for Lublin and Star trucks. The company built buses such as the Jelcz PR110D.

In 1974, the Polish expedition to Lhotse used a Jelcz 316 car to travel from Warsaw to Nepal. In 1975, the expedition of the Wrocław Mountain Club to Broad Peak Central used a Jelcz 315-M car to travel from Wrocław to Islamabad, driving up to 9000 km between 2–21 May.

Since 2004, Jelcz Sp. z o.o. concentrates on producing military trucks, mainly for Polish Armed Forces (for example, the WR-40 Langusta platform). Since 2012, the sole owner of Jelcz sp. z o.o. is Huta Stalowa Wola, which is a part of Polish Armaments Group.

Gallery

See also
Jelcz M11
Jelcz PR110
Jelcz M125M

References
 Jelcz of KMKM Warszawa
 History of JZS

External links

Jelcz Sp. z OO website (Polish)
Jelcz en. website (English)

Truck manufacturers of Poland
Defence companies of Poland
Vehicle manufacturing companies established in 1952
Bus manufacturers of Poland
Polish brands
Polish Limited Liability Companies